Annie Morgan Briggs is a Canadian actress. She is best known for her portrayal of Lola Perry in the web series Carmilla (2014–2016).

Early life 
Briggs grew up in Halifax, Nova Scotia and received her B.A.H. in Theatre from Queen's University. After graduating, she studied at the American Academy of Dramatic Arts in New York City. She later moved to Toronto, Ontario.

Career 
Briggs has appeared on stage in the Reach Ensemble Theatre and Single Thread Theatre. In 2014, she became famous for playing the character of Perry in the LGBT web series Carmilla. In 2015, Briggs was placed 73rd on AfterEllen's Hot 100 List. In 2016 she played the main antagonist—the Dean—in Carmilla as her character Perry was possessed by the Dean.

In 2017, along with her Carmilla co-star Natasha Negovanlis, Briggs launched her own web series called CLAIREvoyant; the series was successfully funded through the Independent Production Fund and an Indiegogo campaign that raised more than $25,000 USD.

Filmography

Theatre

References

External links

21st-century Canadian actresses
Canadian film actresses
Canadian television actresses
Actresses from Halifax, Nova Scotia
Canadian web series actresses
Living people
1988 births